Gholamreza Kianpour (1929 – 8 May 1979) Was an Iranian politician and Minister of Justice in the government of Amir-Abbas Hoveyda and Jamshid Amouzegar (9 November 1976 – 4 September 1978).

History 
Gholamreza Kianpour, son of Abdolvahab, was born in 1929 in Tehran. He completed his education in Daraei High School. He received a bachelor's degree in jurisprudence from the Tehran Law School and a doctorate in economics. First he became a judge of justice, then the director of the program organization, the head of recruitment of principle four and the deputy customs of the Ministry of Economy. Shortly afterwards, he became chairman of the Supreme Administrative Council. He was also appointed governor of West Azerbaijan, Isfahan. In 1974, he was introduced as the Minister of Information and Tourism. In 1976, he became the Minister of Justice, who passed the new laws approved by the parliament. In addition to teaching at the Faculty of Business, Polytechnic, Accounting, Officer and Police, he has authored the principles of budgeting and economics.

His governorship in Isfahan was a flourishing period in the formation of Isfahan city and province as it is today. According to Dariush Homayoun, he was one of the most efficient politicians in Iran during the Pahlavi era.

On August 27, 1978, Gholamreza Kianpour, Minister of Justice was replaced by Mohammad Baheri.

He was killed on May 8, 1979, along with the Speaker of the National Assembly, Javad Saeed and Mohammad Reza Ameli Tehrani, Minister of Information and Tourism and Minister of Education.

References 

Ministers of Justice of Iran
1929 births
1979 deaths
Politicians from Tehran
University of Tehran alumni
Governors of West Azerbaijan Province
Politicians executed during the Iranian Revolution
Governors of Isfahan
Tourism ministers of Iran